Isauricus is a victory title that may refer to:

Publius Servilius Vatia Isauricus (consul 79 BC)
Publius Servilius Vatia Isauricus (consul 48 BC)
Quintus Antonius Isauricus, commander or a legion in Britain during the AD 130s